Platyptilia johnstoni is a moth of the family Pterophoridae first described by Lange in 1940. It is found in Russia and Alaska in the United States.

The wingspan is 19–24 mm. Males have uniform gray and brown forewings, while females have an oblique dash on the first lobe.

References

Moths described in 1940
johnstoni